Encephalartos pterogonus is a species of cycad that is native to Mount Mruwere (Monte Urueri) and adjacent mountains in the Manica province of Mozambique.

Description
It is a cycad with an erect stem, up to 1.5 m tall and with a diameter of about 40 cm, sometimes with secondary stems that originate from suckers that arise at the base of the main stem. 

The leaves, pinnate, 1.2-1.5 m long, are arranged in a crown at the apex of the stem and are supported by a 4-8 cm long petiole; each leaf is composed of several pairs of dark green lanceolate leaflets, on average 15-18 cm long.

It is a dioecious species with male specimens showing 1-3 cones, spindle-shaped, 30–38 cm long and 10–11 cm broad, pedunculated, and female specimens with 2-3 coarsely cylindrical cones, 35–40 cm long and with a diameter of 16-18 cm, bright green.

The seeds are coarsely ovoid, 28–35 mm long, covered with an orange-red sarcotesta when ripe.

References

External links
 
 

pterogonus
Plants described in 2010